Muzhdif (Tajik: Муждиф) is a village in Sughd Region, northwestern Tajikistan. It is part of the jamoat Ivan-Tojik in the Kuhistoni Mastchoh District. Population — 383 people (2017).

References

Populated places in Sughd Region